Laurent Fombertasse (born 26 January 1968) is a French weightlifter. He competed at the 1988 Summer Olympics and the 1992 Summer Olympics.

References

1968 births
Living people
French male weightlifters
Olympic weightlifters of France
Weightlifters at the 1988 Summer Olympics
Weightlifters at the 1992 Summer Olympics
Sportspeople from Mayenne
20th-century French people